Jeremy Biddle (born April 4, 1994), known professionally as Yung Bleu or BLEU, is an American rapper and singer. He is best known for his 2020 single "You're Mines Still", which peaked at number 18 on the Billboard Hot 100 after it was remixed by Canadian rapper Drake.

Life and career 
Biddle was born and raised in Mobile, Alabama. He started making music in 2013, releasing a string of mixtapes that had his name circulate throughout the Southern scene, and eventually signed a deal with Columbia Records through Boosie Badazz's label Bad Azz Music Syndicate.

In 2017, he came back on the scene with the singles "Miss It" and "Ice on My Baby" from the mixtape Investments 4, which featured a guest appearance from YoungBoy Never Broke Again. In 2018, he released a remix for "Miss It" featuring Kid Ink and for "Ice on My Baby" featuring Kevin Gates.

In 2020, he released the mixtape Inv 5 and the EP Bleu Vandross, which were his last releases under Columbia Records and Bad Azz Music. Later that year, he signed a deal with Empire Distribution and a management deal with Meek Mill's label Dream Chasers Records. The same year, he released the EP Love Scars: The 5 Stages of Emotions, which included the single "You're Mines Still". A remix for "You're Mines Still" featuring Canadian rapper and singer Drake was released through OVO Sound on October 16, 2020, after the two artists were connected by basketball player DeMarcus Cousins. The remix peaked at number 18 on the Billboard Hot 100, which helped Love Scars: The 5 Stages of Emotions to enter the Billboard 200 chart.

In 2021, Biddle released the singles "Thieves in Atlanta" featuring Coi Leray, "Baddest" featuring Chris Brown and 2 Chainz, and "Way More Close (Stuck in a Box)" featuring Big Sean. All of the three songs appeared on Biddle's debut album Moon Boy, released on July 23 of the same year. The album features guest appearances from Drake, Gunna, Big Sean, Kehlani, Chris Brown, 2 Chainz, A Boogie wit da Hoodie, Moneybagg Yo, H.E.R., and Kodak Black.

On September 16, 2022, he released "Love in the Way" with Nicki Minaj, the lead single from his second studio album Tantra, which was released on November 11, 2022. The album also includes guest appearances by Fivio Foreign, Lucky Daye, Ty Dolla $ign, Ne-Yo, Zayn, Kelly Rowland and Lil Wayne.

Discography

Studio albums

Mixtapes

Extended plays

Singles

As lead artist

As featured artist

Other charted songs

Guest appearances

Notes

Notes

References 

1994 births
Living people
Southern hip hop musicians
American contemporary R&B singers
21st-century American male singers
21st-century American singers
21st-century American rappers
Rappers from Alabama
Singers from Alabama